Phú Hòa may refer to several places in Vietnam:

 Phú Hòa District, a rural district of Phú Yên Province
 Phú Hòa, Huế, a ward of Huế
 Phú Hòa, Bình Dương, a ward of Thủ Dầu Một
 Phú Hòa, Gia Lai, a township and capital of Chư Păh District
 Phú Hòa, Phú Yên, a township and capital of Phú Hòa District
 Phú Hòa, An Giang, a township and capital of Thoại Sơn District
 Phú Hòa, Đồng Nai, a commune of Định Quán District
 Phú Hòa, Bắc Ninh, a commune of Lương Tài District

See also
 Phú Hòa Đông, a commune of Củ Chi District, Ho Chi Minh City
 Phù Hóa, a commune of Quảng Trạch District, Quảng Bình Province